Jean-Marie Pelletier (born June 26, 1933) is a former Canadian politician, who represented the electoral district of Kamouraska from 1970 to 1973, and Kamouraska-Témiscouata from 1973 to 1976, in the National Assembly of Quebec. He was a member of the Quebec Liberal Party. Pelletier was born in La Pocatière, Quebec.

External links
 

1933 births
Living people
Quebec Liberal Party MNAs
People from Bas-Saint-Laurent